The Ochsenkopf Transmitter is a  radio and TV tower of reinforced concrete, which was built in 1958 on the summit of the  Ochsenkopf mountain, the second-highest mountain in the Fichtelgebirge mountain chain in Northern Bavaria, Germany. The tower replaced a  guyed steel tube TV mast that collapsed in January 1958 as result of icing. The tower, which is not accessible to the public, has a hyperbolic-shaped basement with five floors for technical equipment. Above it, there are platforms for directional antennas. The antennas for FM-transmission are on the upper part of the concrete tower, those for TV transmission on a steel tube mast on the top.

Transmitting to the former GDR

Ochsenkopf TV Tower played an important role in transmitting to the former GDR many West German FM and TV programs, notably ARD, West Germany's first – and between 1952 and 1963 only – television channel. Its signal could penetrate deep into the southern territory of East Germany due to its closeness to the border, its use of a low frequency (VHF Band I channel 4), and of vertical polarization.  Under good conditions, its signal could be received as far away as Görlitz on the East German-Polish border, even though most aerials there were pointed at the West Berlin transmitters.

The transmitter required large and specifically mounted aerials nicknamed Ochsenkopf-Antenne, or Ochsenkopf for short, thus making the homes of viewers of western television easily recognizable. A campaign in the early 1960s by East Germany's state youth organisation FDJ aimed at turning away or removing such aerials exploited this fact.

Similar towers
Many other TV towers of similar design were built after 1958 in Germany and other European countries, including:

 Święty Krzyż TV Tower in Poland
 Brotjacklriegel TV Tower in Germany
 Donnersberg TV Tower in Germany
 Ještěd Tower in Czech Republic
 Schladming TV Tower, Austria 
 Kitzbüheler Horn transmitter, Austria
 Mugel TV Tower, Austria
 Slanchev Bryag TV Tower, Bulgaria 
 Stramni Rid TV Tower, Bulgaria  
 Ostankino Tower in Moscow, Russia

Transmitted Programs

FM Radio

Television (digital, DVB-T standard)
Launched on November 25, 2008.

Former Programs

Television (analogue, PAL standard)
Shut down on November 30, 2008.

The public channels ZDF and Bayerisches Fernsehen for the region were previously transmitted from the nearby mountain Großer Waldstein.

See also
 List of towers

References

External links
 
 http://www.skyscraperpage.com/diagrams/?b54478
 Video: Final closedown of analogue channel E4

1958 establishments in West Germany
Hyperboloid structures
Fichtel Mountains
Radio masts and towers in Germany
Towers completed in 1958
Buildings and structures in Bayreuth (district)